Tiverton Town Football Club are an English football club based in Tiverton, Devon.

History
The club was established in 1913 as Tiverton Athletic, and initially played at the Athletic Ground. They joined the East Devon League, winning the Senior Division in 1924–25, 1925–26, 1926–27 and 1927–28. They then joined the North Devon League, winning it in 1931–32, after which they transferred to the Exeter & District League, which they won in 1933–34.

In 1951–52 the club won the league's Senior Division, and in 1956 won the Devon Senior Cup for the first time. They won the league again in 1964–65 and 1965–66, a season in which they also won the Senior Cup for a second time.

In 1973 the club joined the Western League. They were relegated to Division One at the end of the 1980–81 season after finishing bottom of the league. After finishing as runners-up in 1988–89, they were promoted back to the Premier Division. Following two fourth-placed finishes, the club finished third in 1991–92, second in 1992–93 (a season in which they also won the League Cup for the first time), and won the league and League Cup double in 1993–94. They won the league again the following season, and after finishing as runners-up in 1995–96, a season in which they also picked up the League Cup, achieved back-to-back titles again in 1996–97 (a double season) and 1997–98. They also won the FA Vase in 1998, beating Tow Law Town 1–0 in the final.

In 1998–99 the club won the FA Vase again, beating Bedlington Terriers 1–0, and finished second in the league, earning promotion to Division One West of the Southern League. In 2000–01 they finished second, and were promoted to the Premier Division, where they remained until 2011. In 2006–07 they won the Southern League Cup.

On 18 April 2012 it was announced in the national press that Tiverton had appointed 27-year-old internet entrepreneur Matthew Conridge as their new chairman. Believed to be one of the youngest football chairman in the UK ever Conridge was quoted as saying, "I'm not here to chuck thousands of pounds into a black hole, I'm here to pull everyone together and work with a good team......This club will not spend more than it can afford to chase a dream......If we can't afford a budget to go to Blue Square Bet South we won't pay it".

On 30 April 2013 Tiverton Town released a press release as follows "Tiverton Town can confirm that Matthew Conridge has stepped down as Chairman of Tiverton Town to pursue other business interests. The club would like to place on record its gratitude for all his hard work whilst in the position. Former Tivvy chairman Dave Wright is taking over the position of chairman for the time being. The club also wishes to confirm the departure of interim manager Jamie Ward together with his assistant Paul Short."

In May 2013 Tiverton town released the following press release to announce the arrival of John Clarkson as their new manager "John Clarkson was tonight introduced to the media and Tivvy fans at a press conference at Ladysmead. Clarkson has arrived from Spain where he was manager of Ontinyent in Segunda B. He had been managing in Spain for the last six years".

In May 2014, Tiverton Town manager John Clarkson stepped down from the position following the team's disappointing 2–0 Devon Bowl Final defeat to Plymouth Parkway who were playing in the league below Tiverton. He had led the side to the play-off's, where they lost to 9-man Paulton, and two Cup finals but cited the last couple of months as the reason he was going, "The last couple of months have really taken it out of me, three or four games a week was just too much" He added,"I'm off to take my coaching badges during the summer and once I've completed them I will decide on what I'm going to do"
Despite a much higher wage budget than other teams in the league (due to John Clarkson's financial input) the club could not reach its aim of promotion in its centenary season.
At the end of the season many of the club's higher profile players left following John Clarkson's resignation and the reduction of the wage budget.
Yellows legend Martyn Rogers was named as Clarkson's replacement and given the task of rebuilding the squad on a much more restricted wage budget.

In the 2016/17 season Tiverton Town gained promotion to the Southern League Premier Division. They beat Salisbury 0–2 with goals from Michael Landricombe and Tom Bath in the playoff final in front of over 2,000, returning them to the Southern League Premier after being relegated in 2011.

In the 2017/18 season following promotion from the 8th tier Tivvy finished in a highly respectable position of 6th. Especially considering the low budget and crowds compared to the top 5 and most of the league. However, despite this Tivvy managed to beat 4 of the top 5 with playoff hopes ending due to poor away form.

Stadium
The club currently play at The Ian Moorcroft Stadium, Ladysmead, Bolham Road, Tiverton, Devon, EX16 6SG.

Opened in 1946, the ground has a capacity of 3,500, of which 520 is seated.

As Tiverton Athletic, the club played its home games at the Athletic Ground, now known as Amory Park. The ground boasted a huge wooden pavilion with a seated veranda, which was quite extravagant for a non-league club in the 1910s. In 1921, Athletic were effectively evicted from their ground and moved to a local rugby pitch, Elm Field (aka "The Elms"), with the reformed rugby club taking their place at their old ground. The Elms housed a wooden 150-seat stand on one side, with grass banks behind the goals being the only other spectator zones.

The Elms was virtually destroyed during World War II, meaning the club had to move, eventually relocating to Ladysmead. The club's record attendance of 3,000 came in the FA Cup first round, against Leyton Orient on 12 November 1994.

Players
As of 05 August 2022.

Current squad

Out on loan

Non-Playing Staff

Corporate hierarchy

Coaching staff

Senior club staff

Finance Manager: Kimm Smith
Groundstaff :  Gordon Curtis, Les Williamson, Brian Whiting
Southern League Secretary: John Fournier
Fixtures Secretary: John Fournier
Club Safety Officer: Marian Pile
Club Welfare Officer: Marian Pile
Community Outreach Officer: Paul Gray
Supporters Club Shop: Maxwell Fournier
Club Photographer: Viv Curtis & Alexander Sorlie-Pring
Website & Programme Editor: Maxwell Fournier
Press & Social Media Officer Maxwell Fournier

Honours
FA Vase
Winners 1998, 1999
Runners-up 1993
Southern League
South & West Division One Play-Off Winners 2016–17
League Cup winners 2007
Western League
Champions 1993–94, 1994–95, 1996–97, 1997–98
League Cup winners 1992–93, 1993–94, 1995–96, 1996–97, 1997–98
Amateur Trophy Winners 1977–78, 1978–79
Exeter & District League
Champions 1933–34, 1964–65, 1965–66
North Devon League
Champions 1931–32
East Devon League
Senior Division champions 1924–25, 1925–26, 1926–27, 1927–28
East Devon Senior Cup
Winners 1929, 1936, 1938, 1953, 1961, 1963, 1967
Devon Senior Cup
Winners 1956, 1966
Devon St. Luke's Cup
Winners 1991, 1992, 1993, 1994, 1995, 1997, 2000, 2003, 2006, 2017

Club records
Highest League Position: 4th in Southern League premier Division 2002–03
F.A Cup best Performance: First round 1990–91, 1991–92, 1994–95, 1997–98, 2001–02, 2002–03, 2004–05
F.A Trophy best Performance: Fifth round 2000–01
F.A. Vase best performance: Winners 1997–98, 1998–99
League victory: 14–1 v University College SW, 11 February 1933
League defeat: 0–10 v Dawlish Town, 27 December 1969
Record attendance: 3,000 v Leyton Orient, 12 November 1994
Top goalscorer: Phil Everett, 378

Former players
 Players that have played/managed more than 15 times in the football league or any foreign equivalent to this level (i.e. fully professional league).
 Players with full international caps.
 Players that hold a club record or have captained the club.

Craig Alcock
Kwame Ampadu
Elliot Benyon
Steve Book
Simon Bryant
Paul Buckle
Sean Canham
Steve Collis
Matt Villis
Chris Curran
Steve Flack
Ben Foster
George Friend
Matthew Hewlett
Scott Hiley
Kevin Hill
Chris Holloway
Chris Vinnicombe
Ian Hutchinson
John Impey
Scott Laird
Ryan Leonard
Sam Malsom
Nicky Marker
Barry McConnell
Kurt Nogan
Phil Walsh
Mark Ovendale
Richard Pears
Graeme Power
Stephen Reed
Jason Rees
Nathan Rudge
Mark Saunders
Danny Seaborne
John Wilkinson

A list of Tiverton Players former and current can be found, including those that do not meet the criteria above here::Category:Tiverton Town F.C. players

References

External links
Official website
Youth Development & Academy

Tivvy Archive
Official Twitter Page

Southern Football League clubs
Association football clubs established in 1913
Tiverton, Devon
Football clubs in Devon
1913 establishments in England
Football clubs in England